The Lupata Gorge is a gorge on the Zambezi River in Mozambique.  It marks the division between the Middle Zambezi and Lower Zambezi.

Landforms of Mozambique
Canyons and gorges of Africa